is a passenger railway station located in the city of Miki, Hyōgo Prefecture, Japan, operated by the private Kobe Electric Railway (Shintetsu).

Lines

Station layout
The station consists of a ground-level side platform serving a single bi-directional track. The station is unattended.

Adjacent stations

History
It was renamed to its present name on April 1, 1939.

Passenger statistics
In fiscal 2019, the station was used by an average of 622 passengers daily.

Surrounding area
 Miki City Hall
Miki Municipal Miki Elementary School
 Miki Municipal Miki Higashi Junior High Scho

See also
List of railway stations in Japan

References

External links

 Official website (Kobe Electric Railway) 

Railway stations in Japan opened in 1937
Railway stations in Hyōgo Prefecture
Miki, Hyōgo